Hlersu (Lesu 勒苏), or Sansu (Shansu 散苏), is a Loloish language of Yunnan Province, China.  It is spoken in Xinping, Jinping, Zhenyuan, Eshan (as Shansu 山苏), and (as Sansu) Yuanjiang County.

Hlersu (autonym: ; exonym: ;  autonym reported in Yunnan (1955)) is spoken in 13 townships (50 administrative villages and 143 hamlets) by 4,040 households and 15,737 persons in Xinping, Yuanjiang, and Eshan counties (Xu & Bai 2013:1).

References

Xu Xianmin [许鲜明], Bai Bibo [白碧波] (2013). A study of Shansu [山苏彝语研究]. Beijing: Ethnic Publishing House [民族出版社]. 

Loloish languages